The Hughes 22 is a Canadian trailerable sailboat that was designed by Howard Hughes, the co-founder of Hughes Boat Works, as a cruiser and first built in 1971.

The design was also sold as the North Star 22 and the Hullmaster 22.

Production
The design was initially built by Hughes Boat Works in Canada. When the company was sold to US Steel and the name changed to North Star Yachts, the boat was renamed as the North Star 22. It was later built by Hullmaster Boats, also in Canada, as the Hullmaster 22. It may have also been produced under other names, before production ended.

Design
The Hughes 22 is a recreational keelboat, built predominantly of fibreglass, with wooden trim. It has a masthead sloop rig, a raked stem, a plumb transom, a transom-hung rudder controlled by a  tiller and a fixed stub keel with a cast itron centreboard. It displaces  and carries  of iron ballast.

A version  of the North Star 22 was also built with a fin keel and a spade-type rudder.

The boat is normally fitted with a small  outboard motor for docking and maneuvering.

The design has sleeping accommodation for five people, with a double "V"-berth in the bow cabin, a straight settee in the main cabin and a drop down dinntte table that coverts to a double berth on the starboard side of the main cabin. The galley is located on the port sideand stows under the cockpit seat. The head is located in the bow cabin on the starboard side under the "V"-berth.

Operational history
In a 2010 review Steve Henkel wrote, "best features: Built for entry-level sailors at a price low enough to attract them, the Hughes 22 has little else to recommend it. Worst features: Of the three comp[etitor]s listed together here [the Seaward 22 and Columbia 22], the Hughes 22 is to our taste the least salty looking, with her mismatched portlights and featureless, slab-sided hull. She lacks a forward hatch, carries a cast iron keel rather than a molded lead one, and her accommodations plan shows a portside berth only 18 inches wide (versus the accepted industry absolute minimum of 21 inches), In addition, her offset cabin sole is inappropriate for a boat this small."

See also
List of sailing boat types

References

External links
Video tour of a Hughes 22

Keelboats
1970s sailboat type designs
Sailing yachts
Trailer sailers
Sailboat type designs by Howard Hughes
Sailboat types built by Hughes Boat Works
Sailboat types built by North Star Yachts
Sailboat types built by Hullmaster Boats